Robert Franklin "Butch" Leitzinger (born February 28, 1969) is an American professional racing driver. He is best known as an ALMS driver with Dyson Racing, but he has also driven for a variety of other teams and race series. He won the IMSA Pro WSC Ckampionship driver's titles in both 1997 and 1998 while driving for Dyson Racing. Also a three time winner of the Daytona 24 hours race in 1994, 1997 and 1999.

Racing career

Sports car racing

Leitzinger has driven for the Bentley factory team at Le Mans in 2001 and 2002, for the Cadillac team at Le Mans in 2000 and for Panoz at Le Mans in 1999. Leitzinger has also driven in the GT classification for Risi Competizione at Le Mans in 2003. Leitzinger was also named 2002 Rookie of the Year in the Trans-Am Series. Butch drove the Alex Job Racing (AJR) No. 81 Porsche GT3 car in the first four events in the American Le Mans Series GTC class for the 2010 season, with Juan Gonzales earning victories at the 2010 12 Hours of Sebring as well as at Long Beach and a podium finish at Laguna Seca, resulting in the duo achieving a healthy lead in the points standings before unfortunate circumstances forced Alex Job Racing to downsize to a single-car effort with the No. 23 car for the remainder of the season.

Leitzinger spent the 2011 season as a substitute driver when needed and as a third driver during endurance races. As a substitute, Leitzinger ran a total of two ALMS races, one of which was the Lime Rock race in which he and Bill Sweedler finished third in class in the AJR GTC Porsche. The other race was the Road America race in which he drove the PR1/Mathiasen Motorsports LMPC car with Rudy Junco and on his first time ever driving an LMPC car and the first time with the team Leitzinger qualified on pole in class and along with Junco, won the race in class. As a third driver in endurance races Leitzinger drove along with Humaid Al Masaood and Steven Kane in the No. 20 Oryx Dyson Racing car at Laguna Seca and Road Atlanta. At Laguna Seca the 20 car led much of the race and finished in third. In the Petit Le Mans at Road Atlanta the car was sidelined early with a throttle position sensor problem.

It was later announced that Leitzinger would drive the full 2012 season in the ALMS in the PR1/Mathiasen Motorsports LMPC car. The 2012 season will reunite the successful combination from Road America 2011 of PR1/Mathiasen Motorsports, Leitzinger, and Junco, who were co-drivers for the majority of the 2012 season.

Leitzinger shared the 1999 United States Road Racing Championship (USRRC) championship with teammate Elliott Forbes-Robinson and won the famed Rolex 24 at Daytona: twice with Dyson Racing (1997 & 1999), and once in a Nissan 300ZX (1994) co-driven with Scott Pruett, Steve Millen and Paul Gentilozzi.

At the beginning of their involvement in ALMS, Leitzinger and the Dyson team fielded Ford-powered Riley & Scott cars but switched to the newer MG-Lola EX257 midway through the 2002 season. Dyson Racing achieved its first ALMS victory in the car when Leitzinger and James Weaver scored an overall win at Infineon Raceway in Sonoma, California. This also marked the first time that an LMP675 (now called LMP2) class car scored an overall win in an ALMS race.

NASCAR
Leitzinger competed in NASCAR races as a road course ringer. He ran in three Winston Cup Series races at Watkins Glen with a best finish of 12th in 1995. On June 24, 2007, Leitzinger ran the NASCAR Nextel Cup race at Infineon Raceway in the Bill Davis Racing-owned No. 23 Caterpillar Toyota and finished 28th. Butch's nearest-miss in NASCAR racing was the Busch Series race at Watkins Glen in 2000 when he drove the No. 30 car for Innovative Motorsports; he led 13 laps, and finished second behind fellow ringer Ron Fellows.

Personal life
Leitzinger lives in State College, Pennsylvania with his wife, Kirsten, and their daughter and son. He earned a Bachelor of Science in business management from Penn State University in 1991. He is the son of IMSA driver, Bob Leitzinger, and artist Sandra Leitzinger.

Motorsports career results

24 Hours of Le Mans

NASCAR
(key) (Bold – Pole position awarded by qualifying time. Italics – Pole position earned by points standings or practice time. * – Most laps led.)

Nextel Cup Series

Busch Series

 Leitzinger's team was a post-entry for the race and thus did not receive points.

Busch North Series

References

External links
 
 
  Butch Leitzinger], Dyson Racing
 Butch Leitzinger is the Class of American Racing, Speed Channel editorial July 8, 2005
  PWC 2014 Toronto on Board Highlights of Butch Leitzinger Round 9  GT 
 The Complete Driver: Butch Leitzinger of Dyson Racing, RaceFamily Motorsports

1969 births
Living people
NASCAR drivers
NASCAR team owners
American Le Mans Series drivers
Trans-Am Series drivers
Smeal College of Business alumni
People from Homestead, Pennsylvania
24 Hours of Le Mans drivers
24 Hours of Daytona drivers
Racing drivers from Pennsylvania
Racing drivers from Pittsburgh
Rolex Sports Car Series drivers
David Price Racing drivers